John Garbrand may refer to:
John Garbrand (priest) (aka Herks; 1542–1589), English prebendary of Salisbury Cathedral
John Garbrand (writer) (1646/7–?), English political writer